Chmeľová is a village and small municipality in Bardejov District in the Prešov Region of north-east Slovakia, formerly known as Komloša.

History
In historical records the village was first mentioned in 1414.

Geography
The municipality lies at an altitude of 365 metres and covers an area of 12.431 km².
It has a population of about 400 people.

Genealogical resources

The records for genealogical research are available at the state archive "Statny Archiv in Presov, Slovakia"

 Roman Catholic church records (births/marriages/deaths): 1695-1895 (parish B)
 Greek Catholic church records (births/marriages/deaths): 1758-1908 (parish A)

See also
 List of municipalities and towns in Slovakia

References

External links
 
 
https://web.archive.org/web/20071116010355/http://www.statistics.sk/mosmis/eng/run.html
Surnames of living people in Chmelova

Villages and municipalities in Bardejov District
Šariš